Francisco Gaudencio Lope Belardo Mañalac (born March 21, 1976), popularly known as Bamboo Mañalac or simply by the mononym Bamboo, is a Filipino-American musician and singer-songwriter. He began his career as vocalist and original frontman of Rivermaya and later fronted his own band, Bamboo. Bamboo band disbanded in 2011 and Mañalac then pursued a solo career and released his first solo album, No Water, No Moon.

Mañalac is known for his distinct vocals, which combines elements of rock with a mellow technique; he also has a notably eccentric style in live performances. His musical and singing style as well as his band's polished sound have made him an icon in the Philippine music industry.

Early life
Mañalac was born in Quezon City, Philippines to Filipino parents. His family immigrated to San Francisco, California when he was 10 years old and spent the rest of his childhood there. He was named after a combination of his grandfathers' names and coincidentally after his home city. His mother gave him the nickname "Bamboo" when he was still a kid.

Career

Band frontman

1994–1998: Rivermaya

Rivermaya's roots came from a band named Xaga consisting of Jesse Gonzales on vocals, Kenneth Ilagan on guitars, Nathan Azarcon on bass guitar, Rome Velayo on drums, and Rico Blanco on keyboards and backing vocals. The band was managed by Lizza Nakpil and director Chito S. Roño. In the process of grueling practice sessions, Azarcon's former schoolmate Mañalac replaced Gonzales, as well as Azarcon's childhood friend, Mark Escueta, replaced Velayo, and later, Ilagan was replaced with Perf de Castro. With Mañalac as frontman, the band members themselves decided to disband Xaga and form the band Rivermaya. They started putting together original songs like "Ulan", "214", and "Awit ng Kabataan" in demo form for prospective recording companies. Since its formation, the band has launched several successful albums, received numerous awards, and has undertaken several successful concerts and tours.

After the band's successful US and Canada tours, Mañalac decided to leave the band and stay with his family in the United States. His last performance with the band was on October 10, 1998, in Oakland, CA. Despite of the popular belief and rumors saying that he was removed from the group due to drug addiction, Mañalac dismissed this as a mere "fan theory" claiming that he does not even smoke and have not tried taking drugs ever since, even out of curiosity. He actually went back to school in San Francisco and Los Angeles and took up English, Philosophy and Film which were his majors and did several odd jobs.

2003–2011: Bamboo

In 2002, after living in Los Angeles following the Rivermaya tour in America, Mañalac returned to the Philippines. His former bandmate in Rivermaya, Nathan Azarcon, introduced him to Ira Cruz and Vic Mercado. Later, all of them joined together and formed the band Bamboo. Since then, the band had launched four successful albums, and received numerous awards.

Rumors were initially spreading on January 10, 2011, after KC Montero tweeted on Twitter that the band has decided to call it quits. On January 11, 2011, Mañalac published an official statement in the band's official website. He said:

Solo career

2011–present
In November 2011, Mañalac released his solo debut album, No Water, No Moon, under the label of PolyEast Records. The album consists 12 tracks with "Questions" as its carrier single. The album reached gold record in February 2013 after selling more than 7,500 copies.

In January 2012, Mañalac joined ASAP as a mainstay cast and a performer in the show.

On February 10, 2013, during an appearance on the last episode of Sarah G. Live, Bamboo Mañalac hinted that he would be working with Sarah Geronimo after they both finished performing a production number together. On February 14, 2013, ABS-CBN aired a promotional plug during the airtime of the pre-primetime television drama Kahit Konting Pagtingin, confirming Bamboo Mañalac's stint in The Voice of the Philippines as coach and judge. In an interview made by ABS-CBN News, Mañalac provided a statement regarding his stint on the show, "I'm ready to be a coach. There's a time for everything and this is it." When asked on what kind of artist will he would like to coach, he said, "I’ve been listening to rock for a long time but I also listen to other genres from rock to pop to folk to everything. I want someone who is open to all kinds of music; someone who is willing to listen and willing to learn."

Bamboo, alongside Sarah Geronimo, and Lea Salonga returned as coaches for The Voice Kids Philippines from 2014 to present.

In October 2015, four years after the release of his first album, Bamboo released his second solo album entitled Bless this Mess. The 10-track album was recorded in Grand Street Recording Studio, Brooklyn, New York.

Personal life
Mañalac is married and has kids. Mañalac is evasive when it comes to his personal life.

Discography
Solo albums
 No Water, No Moon (2012)
 Bless This Mess (2015)

with Bamboo
 As the Music Plays (2004)
 Light Peace Love (2005)
 We Stand Alone Together (2007)
 Tomorrow Becomes Yesterday (2008)

with Rivermaya
 Rivermaya (1994)
 Trip (1996)
 Atomic Bomb (1997)

Filmography

NOTE: This list only includes Mañalac's regular television shows. Short television guestings are not included.

Awards

References

External links

 

Filipino rock musicians
21st-century Filipino male singers
Filipino songwriters
Living people
Filipino emigrants to the United States
Rivermaya members
ABS-CBN personalities
Musicians from Quezon City
PolyEast Records artists
1976 births
20th-century Filipino male singers